Jesse Corti (born July 3, 1955) is an American actor and theater director best known for playing Courfeyrac in the original Broadway show Les Misérables and for voicing LeFou in Beauty and the Beast.

Career 
Corti also voiced the Spanish Dignitary in Frozen and Mr. Manchas in Zootopia.  He has appeared in numerous feature films, and in several popular TV series such as 24, Heroes, Desperate Housewives, The West Wing, Judging Amy, Law & Order and many more. In 1990, he received a Clio Award for his Drug Free America commercial. Corti has also directed various stage productions in Los Angeles.

Personal life 
Corti was previously married to Laura Lyn Deberardino, whom he wed in 1986. Laura was killed a year later in a 1987 collision between an Amtrak train and a Conrail freight train in Chase, Maryland. At that time, Laura Corti had been returning to New York City after having seen her husband perform in Les Misérables at the Kennedy Center in Washington, D.C. The crew of the freight train in that collision tested positive for marijuana and Jesse Corti subsequently appeared in both an English-language and a Spanish-language public service announcement for Partnership for a Drug-Free America.

Filmography

Film

Television

Video games

Theme parks

Theatre

References

External links 

Living people
American male voice actors
American male television actors
American male film actors
American male stage actors
American male video game actors
Clio Award winners
Venezuelan emigrants to the United States
People from Paterson, New Jersey
1955 births